Dodola (also spelled Dodole, Dudola, Dudula etc.) and Perperuna (also spelled Peperuda, Preperuda, Preperuša, Prporuša, Papaluga etc.), are Balkan rainmaking pagan customs practiced until the 20th century. The tradition is found in South Slavic countries (Bulgaria, Croatia, North Macedonia, Montenegro, and Serbia), as well as in near Albania, Greece, Hungary, Moldavia and Romania.

It is a ceremonial ritual of singing and dancing done by young boys and girls in times of droughts. According to some interpretations it was related to Slavic god Perun, and Perperuna could have been a Slavic goddess of rain, and the wife of the supreme deity Perun (god of thunder and weather in the Slavic pantheon).

Names 
 The custom's Slavic prototype name is *Perperuna (with variations Preperuna, Peperuna, Preperuda/Peperuda, Pepereda, Preperuga/Peperuga, Peperunga, Pemperuga in Bulgaria and North Macedonia: Prporuša, Parparuša, Preporuša/Preporuča, Preperuša, Barburuša/Barbaruša in Croatia; Peperuda, Papaluga, Papaluda/Paparuda, Babaruta, Mamaruta in Romania and Moldavia; Perperouna, Perperinon, Perperouga, Parparouna in Greece; Perperona/Perperone, Rona in Albania; Pirpirunã among Aromanians) and Dodola (including Serbia among previous countries, with variants Dodole, Dudola, Dudula, Dudule, Dudulica, Doda, Dodočka, Dudulejka, Didjulja, Dordolec/Durdulec etc.). They can be found among South Slavs, Albanians, Greeks, Hungarians, Moldavians, Romanians, Vlachs or Aromanians (including regions of Bukovina and Bessarabia).

All variants are considered to be taboo-alternations to "avoid profaning the holy name" of pagan god. According to Roman Jakobson and others perperuna is formed by reduplication of root "per-" (to strike/beat). Those with root "peper-", "papar-" and "pirpir-" were changed accordingly modern words for pepper-tree and poppy plant, possibly also perper and else. Dimitar Marinov derived it from Bulgarian word for butterfly where in folk beliefs has supernatural powers related to rain, but according to Jakobson the mythological context of the customs and links explains the Bulgarian entomological names. Michail Arnaudov derived it from Slavic verb "pršiti" (spray). Petar Skok considered prporuša a metaphorical derivation from Slavic prpor/pŕpa (hot ash), pórusa ("when water is poured on burning ash"). Stanisław Urbańczyk and Michal Łuczyński put into question Jakobson's theonymic derivation, deriving instead from Proto-Slavic *perpera, *perperъka (in Polish przepiórka), name for Common quail, which has a role in Polish harvest rituals and the name of the bride in the wedding dance. These are also related to *pъrpati (onomatopoeic), cf. Polish dial. perpotać, perpac, Old East Slavic poropriti.

Origin 

The rainmaking practice is a shared tradition among Balkan peoples, and it is not clear who borrowed it from whom. The fact so similar customs in the Balkans are known by two different names the differences are considered not to be from the same time period and ethnic groups.

It is usually considered they have a mythological and etymological Slavic origin related to Slavic thunder-god Perun, and became widespread in the Southeastern Europe with the Slavic migrations to the Balkans (6th-10th century). According to the Slavic theory, it is a (Balto-)Slavic heritage of Proto-Indo-European origin related to Slavic thunder-god Perun. It has parallels in ritual prayers for bringing rain in times of drought dedicated to rain-thunder deity Parjanya recorded in the Vedas and Baltic thunder-god Perkūnas, cognates alongside Perun of Proto-Indo-European weather-god Perkwunos. The same ritual in an early medieval Ruthenian manuscript is related to East Slavic deity Pereplut. According to Jakobson, Novgorod Chronicle ("dožd prapruden") and Pskov Chronicle ("dožd praprudoju neiskazaemo silen") could have "East Slavic trace of Peperuda calling forth the rain", and West Slavic god Pripegala reminds of Preperuga/Prepeluga variation and connection with Perun. Serbo-Croatian archaic variant Prporuša and verb prporiti se ("to fight") also have parallels in Old Russian ("porъprjutъsja"). The name Dodola is cognate with the Lithuanian Dundulis, a word for "thunder" and another name of the Baltic thunder-god Perkūnas. It is also distantly related to Greek Dodona and Daedala. Bulgarian variant Didjulja is similar to alleged Polish goddess Dzidzilela, and Polish language also has verb dudnić ("to thunder"). According to another interpretation the name Perperuna can be identified as the reduplicated feminine derivative of the name of the male god Perun (per-perun-a), being his female consort, wife and goddess of rain Perperuna Dodola, which parallels the Old Norse couple Fjörgyn–Fjörgynn and the Lithuanian Perkūnas–Perkūnija. Perun's battle against Veles because of Perperuna/Dodola's kidnapping has paralles in Zeus saving of Persephone after Hades carried her underground causing big drought on Earth, also seen in the similarity of the names Perperuna and Persephone. Recent research criticize invention of a Slavic female goddess. Another explanation for the variations of the name Dodola is relation to the Slavic spring goddess (Dido-)Lada/Lado/Lela, some scholars relate Dodole with pagan custom and songs of Lade (Ladarice) in Hrvatsko Zagorje (so-called "Ladarice Dodolske"), and in Žumberak-Križevci for the Preperuša custom was also used term Ladekarice.

Similar customs have been observed in the Balkans, Caucasus, Middle East, and North Africa. William Shedden-Ralston noted that Jacob Grimm thought Perperuna/Dodola were "originally identical with the Bavarian Wasservogel and the Austrian Pfingstkönig" rituals. Milenko S. Filipović and Vitomir Belaj, although relating them to the Perun's cult, considering the geographical distribution considered the possibility it also has a Paleo-Balkan background. The Romanian-Aromanian and Greek ethnic origin was rejected by Alan Wace, Maurice Scott Thompson, George Frederick Abbott among others, also noting it was not known in Southern Greece. One theory, in particular, argues that Slavic deity Perun and Perperuna/Dodola customs are of Thracian origin.

Ritual 

Perperuna and Dodola are considered very similar pagan customs with common origin, with main difference being in the most common gender of the central character (possibly related to social hierarchy of the specific ethnic or regional group), lyric verses, sometimes religious content, and presence or absence of a chorus. They essentially belong to rituals related to fertility, but over time differentiated to a specific form connected with water and vegetation. They represent a group of rituals with a human collective going on a procession around houses and fields of a village, but with a central live character which differentiates them from other similar collective rituals in the same region and period (Krstonoše, Poklade, Kolade, German, Ladarice, those during Jurjevo and Ivandan and so on). In the valley of Skopje in North Macedonia the Dodola were held on Thursday which was Perun's day. The core of the song always mentions a type of rain and list of regional crops. The first written mentions and descriptions of the pagan custom are from the 18th century by Dimitrie Cantemir in Description of Moldavia (1714/1771, Papaluga), then in a Greek law book from Bucharest (1765, it invoked 62nd Cannon to stop the custom of Paparuda), and by the Bulgarian hieromonk Spiridon Gabrovski who also noted to be related to Perun (1792, Peperud).

South Slavs and non-Slavic peoples alike used to organise the Perperuna/Dodola ritual in times of spring and especially summer droughts, where they worshipped the god/goddess and prayed to him/her for rain (and fertility, later also asked for other field and house blessings). The central character of the ceremony of Perperuna was usually a young boy, while of Dodola usually a young girl, both aged between 10–15 years. Purity was important, and sometimes to be orphans. They would be naked, but were not anymore in latest forms of 19-20th century, wearing a skirt and dress densely made of fresh green knitted vines, leaves and flowers of Sambucus nigra, Sambucus ebulus, Clematis flammula, Clematis vitalba, fern and other deciduous shrubs and vines, small branches of Tilia, Oak and other. The green cover initially covered all body so that the central person figure was almost unrecognizable, but like the necessity of direct skin contact with greenery it also greatly decreased and was very simple in modern period. They whirled and were followed by a small procession of children who walked and danced with them around the same village and fields, sometimes carrying oak or beech branches, singing the ritual prayer, stopping together at every house yard, where the hosts would sprinkle water on chosen boy/girl who would shake and thus sprinkle everyone and everything around it (example of "analogical magic"), hosts also gifted treats (bread, eggs, cheese, sausages etc., in a later period also money) to children who shared and consumed them among them and sometimes even hosts would drink wine, seemingly as a sacrifice in Perun's honor. The chosen boy/girl was called by one of the name variants of the ritual itself, however in Istria was also known as Prporuš and in Dalmatia-Boka Kotorska as Prpac/Prpats and both regions his companions as Prporuše, while at Pirot and Nišava District in Southern Serbia near Bulgarian border were called as dodolće and preperuđe, and as in Macedonia both names appear in the same song.

By the 20th century once common rituals almost vanished in the Balkans, although rare examples of practice can be traced until 1950-1980s and remained in folk memory. The main reason is the development of agriculture and consequently lack of practical need for existence of mystical connection and customs with nature and weather. Christian church also tried to diminish pagan beliefs and customs, resulting in "dual belief" (dvoeverie) in rural populations, a conscious preservation of pre-Christian beliefs and practices alongside Christianity. Into customs and songs were mixed elements from other rituals including Christianity, but they also influenced the creation of Christian songs and prayers invoking the rain which were used as a close Christian alternative (decline was reportedly faster among Catholics). According to Velimir Deželić Jr. in 1937, it was an old custom that "Christians approved it, took it over and further refined it. In the old days, Prporuša were very much like a pious ritual, only later the leaders - Prpac - began to boast too much, and Prporuše seemed to be more interested in gifts than beautiful singing and prayer". Depending on region, instead of village boys and girls the pagan ritual by then was mostly done by migrating Romani people from other villages and for whom it became a professional performance motivated by gifts, sometimes followed by financially poor members from other ethnic groups. Due to Anti-Romani sentiment, the association with Romani also caused repulsion, shame and ignorance among last generations of members of ethnic groups who originally performed it. Eventually it led to a dichotomy of identification with own traditional heritage, Christianity and stereotypes about Romani witchcraft.

Perperuna songs
Ioan Slavici reported in 1881 that the custom of Paparuga was already "very disbanded" in Romania. Stjepan Žiža in 1889/95 reported that the once common ritual almost vanished in Southwestern and Central-Eastern Istria, Croatia. Ivan Milčetić recorded in 1896 that the custom of Prporuša also almost vanished from the North Adriatic island of Krk, although almost recently it was well known in all Western parts of Croatia, while in other parts as Dodola. Croatian linguist Josip Ribarić recorded in 1916 that it was still alive in Southwestern Istria and Ćićarija (and related it to the 16th century migration from Dalmatia of speakers of Southwestern Istrian dialect). On island of Krk was also known as Barburuša/Barbaruša/Bambaruša (occurrence there is possibly related to the 15th century migration which included besides Croats also Vlach-Istro-Romanian shepherds). It was also widespread in Dalmatia (especially Zadar hinterland, coast and islands), Žumberak (also known as Pepeluše, Prepelice) and Western Slavonia (Križevci). It was held in Istria at least until the 1950s, in Žumberak until the 1960s, while according to one account in Jezera on island Murter the last were in the late 20th century. In Serbia, Perperuna was only found in Kosovo, Southern and Eastern Serbia near Bulgarian border. According to Natko Nodilo the discrepancy in distribution between these two countries makes an idea that originally Perperuna was Croatian while Dodola was Serbian custom. Seemingly it was not present in Slovenia, Northern Croatia, almost all of Bosnia and Herzegovina and Montenegro (only sporadically in Boka Kotorska). Luka Jovović from Virpazar, Montenegro reported in 1896 that in Montenegro existed some koleda custom for summer droughts, but was rare and since 1870s not practiced anymore.

Dodola songs
The oldest record for Dodole rituals in Macedonia is the song "Oj Ljule" from Struga region, recorded in 1861. The Dodola rituals in Macedonia were actively held until the 1960s. In Bulgaria the chorus was also "Oj Ljule". The oldest record in Serbia was by Vuk Karadžić (1841), where was widespread all over the country and held at least until 1950/70s. In Croatia was found in Eastern Slavonia, Southern Baranja and Southeastern Srijem. August Šenoa in his writing about the travel to Okić-grad near Samobor, Croatia mentioned that saw two dodole. To them is related the custom of Lade/Ladarice from other parts of Croatia, having chorus "Oj Lado, oj!" and similar verses "Molimo se višnjem Bogu/Da popuhne tihi vjetar, Da udari rodna kiša/Da porosi naša polja, I travicu mekušicu/Da nam stada Lado, Ugoje se naša stada".

See also 

 Perëndi
 Caloian
 Porevit
 Porenut
 Slavic paganism

References

Bibliography

Further reading 

 . "Dodola (Adatok az esőcsináláshoz)" [Dodola, Beiträge zum Regenmachen]. In: Ethnographia 6 (1895): 418—422. (In Hungarian)

 Boghici, Constantina. "Archaic Elements in the Romanian Spring-Summer Traditions. Landmarks for Dâmboviţa County". In: Bulletin of the Transilvania University of Braşov, Series VIII: Performing Arts 2 (2013): 17-18. https://ceeol.azurewebsites.net/search/article-detail?id=258246
 
 ; . "Dodola and Other Slavonic Folk-Customs in County Baranya (Hungary)". In: Acta Ethnographica, 16 (1967): 399-408.
 Janković, Danica S., and Ljubica S. Janković. “Serbian Folk Dance Tradition in Prizren”. In: Ethnomusicology 6, no. 2 (1962): 117. https://doi.org/10.2307/924671.
 Мандич, Мария. "„Жизнь“ ритуала после „угасания“: Пример додолы из села Сигетчеп в Венгрии" [The ’life’ of an extinguished ritual: The case of the rain ritual dodola from Szigetcsép in Hungary]. In: "Славяноведение" 6 (2019): 15-29. DOI: 10.31857/S0869544X0006755-3 (In Russian)
 Puchner, Walter. “Liedtextstudien Zur Balkanischen Regenlitanei: Mit Spezieller Berücksichtigung Der Bulgarischen Und Griechischen Varianten”. In: Jahrbuch Für Volksliedforschung 29 (1984): 100–111. https://doi.org/10.2307/849291.

External links

 at Etar Architectural-Ethnographic Complex

Albanian folklore
Aromanian culture
Bulgarian folklore
Bulgarian traditions
Croatian folklore
Greek folklore
Macedonian traditions
Moldovan traditions
Rainmaking (ritual)
Romanian folklore
Romanian traditions
Serbian folklore
Serbian traditions
Slavic pseudo-deities
South Slavic culture